Ramchandran Shlok (born 10 March 1995) is an Indian badminton player.

Achievements

BWF International Challenge/Series (7 titles, 4 runners-up)
Men's doubles

Mixed doubles

  BWF International Challenge tournament
  BWF International Series tournament
  BWF Future Series tournament

References

External links 
 

1995 births
Living people
Racket sportspeople from Mumbai
Indian male badminton players